The Russian presidential state car is the official state car of the President of Russia.

The current presidential state car is an Aurus Senat limousine, which replaced a Mercedes-Benz S 600 Guard Pullman.  The car is equipped with many life-saving, offensive, and defensive measures, and is built to the Federal Protective Service's standards. 

The Aurus Senat was developed in Russia by the NAMI as part of the "Kortezh" project. The Senat was publicly presented for the first time at the Fourth inauguration of Vladimir Putin in 2018.

Previous generations

Under the USSR, the General Secretary of the Communist Party was always driven in a Soviet-built ZIL-41052, escorted by Chaikas. Two ZIL limousines are still maintained in the Kremlin garage, and are occasionally used in Day of Victory military parades.

The first foreign limousine used by a Russian president was a W140 Mercedes-Benz S-Class purchased for Boris Yeltsin. This was superseded by a Mercedes-Benz W220, then by a W221. The limousines used by Presidents Yeltsin and Medvedev were stretched and armored by the Belgian firm Carat Duchatelet; for President Medvedev's inauguration a special Carat Duchatelet limousine with a raised roof was ordered. President Putin's Mercedes was a Mercedes-Benz-produced S600 Pullman Guard.

Operation

Recent Russian presidential state cars have been bulletproof, had solid rubber tires, and carried an array of communications equipment.

On state visits, the state car is airlifted to the destination by an Ilyushin Il-76 transport aircraft.

The presidential motorcade is usually escorted by Ural or BMW motorcycles; and Mercedes G-Class, Mercedes E-Class, S-Class, BMW 5 Series, Volkswagen Caravelle, and/or Chevrolet support vehicles.

National transport services for the Russian President are provided by the Special Purpose Garage (SPG).  The SPG is a unit within the Federal Protective Service.

See also
 Aurus Senat
 Bentley State Limousine
 Federal vehicle fleet
 Ground Force One
 List of official vehicles of the president of the United States
 Official state car
 Popemobile
 Presidential state car (United States)
 ZiL

References

External links

 Unified modular platform // The Government of the Russian Federation assigned FSUE “NAMI” to develop a car for the state leaders
 Every thing you need to know about Russian President Limo Brand Aurus Car

Road transport of heads of state
Presidency of Russia